Donatella Rettore, also simply known as Rettore (born 8 July 1955, in Castelfranco Veneto, Province of Treviso) is an Italian singer and songwriter.

Rettore started her singing career in 1973. Her early recordings was oriented towards Italian music. She became successful in 1979 when she recorded the album Brivido Divino.  Her most popular hits are Splendido Splendente (Splendid Shining), Kobra, Donatella, Lamette (Razor Blades), This Time, Io Ho Te (I've Got You), Amore Stella (Love Star) e Di Notte Specialmente (Especially By Night). The majority of Rettore's albums are a mixture of pop, rock, disco music and ska. In the mid-1980s she experienced a slow decline in popularity, and she had to wait almost a decade before recording a top 10 Italian charts hit. Rettore's most recent album, Stralunata, is an anthological double CD & DVD which entered directly to n. 2 and stayed in top 10 Italian charts for two months.

Filmography

Discography

Albums
1975 Ogni giorno si cantano canzoni d'amore (-)
1977 Donatella Rettore (-)
1979 Brivido divino (#12)
1980 Magnifico delirio (#8)
1981 Estasi clamorosa (#8)
1982 Kamikaze Rock'n'roll Suicide (#18)
1982 Super Rock, le sue più belle canzoni (-)
1983 Far West (#22)
1985 Danceteria (#20)
1988 Rettoressa (#47)
1989 Ossigenata (#39)
1991 Son Rettore e canto (#42)
1994 Incantesimi notturni (#32)
1996 Concert (-)
2005 Figurine (#45)
2008 Stralunata (#2 Dvd Chart)
2011 Caduta massi(#26)
2012 The Best of the Beast (-)

Singles
1973 "Quando Tu" (-)
1974 "Capelli Sciolti" (-)
1975 "Ti Ho Preso Con Me" (-)
1976 "Lailolá" (-)
1977 "Carmela" (-)
1978 "Eroe"(#37)
1979 "Splendido Splendente" (#6)
1980 "Kobra" (#4)
1981 "Donatella" (#3)
1982 "Lamette" (#8)
1982 "This Time" (#8)
1983 "Io Ho Te" (#13)
1985 "Femme Fatale" (#19)
1986 "Amore Stella" (#42)
1987 "Adrenalina" (with Giuni Russo)
1989 "Zan Zan Zan" (#47)
1994 "Di Notte Specialmente" (#9)
2003 "Bastardo" (#29)
2005 "Konkiglia" (-)
2011 "L'Onda del Mar" (-)
2011 "Callo" (-)
2011 "Lamette Katana" (7" vinyl)
2012 "Natale Sottovoce" (-)
2013 "Ciao Ciao" (-)
2013 "Ciao Ciao" (Remixes EP) (-)

References

External links
 Rettore's official page 
 Review of Caduta Massi (in English)

1953 births
Living people
People from Castelfranco Veneto
Italian women singers